T. crocea may refer to:

 Terina crocea, a geometer moth
 Thismia crocea, a myco-heterotrophic plant
 Tridacna crocea, a giant clam
 Tridrepana crocea, a hook tip moth
 Triteleia crocea, a flowering plant
 Turritella crocea, a sea snail